The Lister Nunataks are isolated nunataks located in the northern reaches of Priestley Névé, about  south-southwest of the Brawn Rocks, in Victoria Land, Antarctica. They were mapped by the United States Geological Survey from surveys and U.S. Navy air photos, 1960–64, and were named by the Advisory Committee on Antarctic Names for Larry W. Lister, a helicopter flight crewman with U.S. Navy Squadron VX-6 during Operation Deep Freeze 1966, 1967 and 1968.

References

Nunataks of Victoria Land
Pennell Coast